The 1988–89 Courage League National Division One was the second season of the first tier of the English league system currently known as the Gallagher Premiership. 

Bath became champions for the first time winning the league by a convincing margin from runners–up Gloucester. Waterloo and Liverpool St.Helens finished in the bottom two and were relegated to the 1989–90 Courage League National Division Two.

Participating teams

Table

Results
The home team is listed on the left column.

Sponsorship
National Division One is part of the Courage Clubs Championship and is sponsored by Courage Brewery

See also
 English rugby union system

References

Premiership Rugby seasons
 
English

ko:1987~1988 커리지 리그